Tales of the Algonquin is the seventh studio album by English jazz saxophonist John Surman recorded in 1971 and released on the Deram label.

Reception

John Kelman in his All About Jazz review states: "The music ranges from brashly swinging full-section charts like 'With Terry's Help,' where Surman's powerful soprano solo demonstrates just how quickly he'd evolved into a singular voice, to the more delicately balladic and Gil Evans-inflected 'The Dandelion'. Despite the scripting inherent in this kind of large ensemble work, there's a refreshing looseness and sense of unfettered exploration throughout."

Track listing
All compositions by John Warren.

Side one
 "With Terry's Help"
 "The Dandelion"
 "We'll Make It"
 "The Picture Tree"

Side two
 "Tales of the Algonquin"
 a. "The Purple Swan"
 b. "Shingebis and the North Wind"
 c. "The Adventures of Manabrush"
 d. "The White Water Lily"
 e. "Wihio the Wanderer"

Personnel
Musicians
 Martin Drover — trumpet, flugelhorn
 Kenny Wheeler — trumpet, flugelhorn
 Harry Beckett — trumpet, flugelhorn
 Malcolm Griffiths — trombone
 Ed Harvey — trombone
 Danny Almark — trombone
 Mike Osborne — alto saxophone, clarinet
 Stan Sulzmann — alto saxophone, soprano saxophone, flute
 Alan Skidmore — tenor saxophone, flute, alto flute
 John Surman — baritone saxophone, soprano saxophone
 John Warren — baritone saxophone, flute, soprano saxophone
 John Taylor — piano
 Harry Miller — bass
 Barre Phillips — bass
 Alan Jackson — drums
 Stu Martin — drums

References

External links
 

John Surman albums
1971 albums
Deram Records albums